The Causeway is an arterial traffic crossing in Perth, Western Australia, linking the inner-city suburbs of East Perth and Victoria Park. It is carried over the Swan River at the eastern end of Perth Water by two bridges on either side of Heirisson Island. The current Causeway is the third structure to have been built across the river at this point.

Originally the site of mudflats which restricted river navigation, the Colony Government constructed a causeway and bridge across the site. The project was first planned in 1834 and opened in 1843. When floods in 1862 almost destroyed it, the structure was rebuilt using convict labour, and raised to better withstand future floods. Governor John Hampton officially opened the new Causeway on 12 November 1867. Over the following decades, the three bridges making up this second Causeway were widened several times, and they were eventually replaced in 1952.

The current Causeway bridges were designed by  Godfrey, and built between 1947 and 1952. They were the first in Western Australia to use steel composite construction. Large roundabouts were also constructed at each end of the structure, to improve the flow of traffic. The opening of the Graham Farmer Freeway in 2000 reduced the traffic volume on the Causeway, allowing the two central lanes to be turned into bus lanes. By the early 2000s, the concrete structures had suffered significant damage. Cracks were repaired using carbon fibre reinforcement and localised patching, extending the bridge's life by decades. The Causeway bridges have been recognised for their heritage value by their entry on the Western Australian Register of Heritage Places.

History 
Following the settlement of the Swan River Colony in 1829, the Swan River was the main transportation link between Perth and the port of Fremantle. Land transportation was difficult as the only river crossing near Perth, a ford at the eastern end of the town, was often impassable for wagons and carts.
The only alternative to these river crossings were ferries, which operated from North Fremantle, Preston Point, and The Narrows.

First Causeway
Soon after the colony was founded, settlers lobbied for the construction of a road across the mudflats in the Swan River at the eastern end of the town. A preliminary survey of the site was conducted in 1834 by the Commissioner for Roads and Bridges, George Fletcher Moore, together with Surveyor General John Septimus Roe. A public meeting on 17 February 1837 passed a resolution urging the colony's government to construct the road at the site, and Roe showed the public plans for the proposed causeway. A year later, in January 1838, the Perth Gazette noted that preliminary work had been carried out towards building the causeway, which is thought to have been the upgrading of Adelaide Terrace from the "bush track" it was previously.

A committee was set up in October 1838 to investigate the viability of a causeway at the site. On 16 February 1839 plans which had been prepared by Roe were submitted by the committee's chairman to Henry Trigg, the Superintendent of Public Works. Trigg called for other plans and prepared estimates. At a meeting of the committee on 27 February 1839, Trigg submitted a plan designed by Major Frederick Irwin, which was estimated to cost £2,300. The committee cut the estimated figure to £1,800, and waited for Governor Hutt to specify how much could be funded by the government.

This original "causeway" consisted of a central bridge (for river navigation), with a raised rampart on either side. The first pile of the central bridge was driven home on 2 November 1840. The bridge was completed in 1841, costing £449.10s, although the approaches to the bridge took longer to complete. The causeway was sufficiently completed in January 1842 to be used by horsemen, and the causeway was finally finished in May 1843 at a total cost of £1,814.10s. It was officially opened on 24 May 1843 by J. W. Hardey, the chairman of the Road Trust, in the presence of only one other person, one of his friends.

The causeway was originally a toll road, and costs for crossing ranged from one penny (1d) for a person on foot to 6d for a horse-drawn cart. The tolls were subject to an additional levy of 50 per cent during the night hours. The tolls were later removed, and it appears to have been Perth's only toll road.

Second Causeway 

In June 1862 major flooding was experienced in many towns in the region, resulting in losses over £30,000. In Perth, Mounts Bay Road was completely submerged, and the original causeway was almost destroyed after being under seven or eight feet of water. However, Governor John Hampton ordered that the causeway should be reconstructed and raised several feet. The new Causeway was designed by Richard Roach Jewell and built by convicts.

The opening of the newly refurbished Causeway was a more pompous affair than that of the first Causeway. The second causeway was to be opened by the Duke of Edinburgh, Prince Alfred; however the Royal Navy ship  failed to call in to Western Australia on its way to Sydney. As a result, the Governor proceeded with the opening in the Duke's absence. On 12 November 1867 the Governor drove "through an avenue of flags and bunting" from Government House to the Causeway. There were military corps, a band and a great crowd present for the opening. After speeches by dignitaries, the Governor declared the new Causeway open with the following words:

The proceedings were then disrupted when a man "raced across the newly-opened bridge before the Governor's procession" on horseback after announcing the following to the astonished crowd:

The parade, including the Governor's carriage, then proceeded over the new Causeway after Maley. The Governor's procession continued on steam boats upstream to Guildford where the Governor opened the new Guildford and Helena Bridges.

Budget constraints encountered during construction meant that the bridges were structurally quite weak.

This Causeway was modified several times during its life. In June 1905 the Causeway was placed under the control of the Minister for Works.

Third Causeway 

Plans to build a new bridge at The Narrows downstream from the Causeway in the aftermath of World War II were put on hold while a new Causeway could be constructed. Vehicle traffic using the Causeway had almost doubled between 1930 and 1939.

The current Causeway was built between 1947 and 1952, and designed by E. W. C. Godfrey. It is made up of two bridges, meeting at Heirisson Island. Considerable work was carried out to dredge the river to provide much wider navigation channels. The Heirisson Islands were turned into a single island and a substantial portion of land beside Trinity College was reclaimed.

The bridges were the "first truly modern bridges" built in Perth after World War II, being the first bridges in Western Australia to use steel composite construction, and only the second (and third) in Australia. In order to achieve a sufficiently high clearance above the river channels at high tide, the bridges have graded approaches that increase the roadway elevation.

It is made up of 11 spans, each consisting of nine welded plate girders, with a  relieving span at each end. The north-western bridge is shorter, at only  in length, and has five spans, with a  relieving span at each end. The bridge decks are of reinforced concrete supported by the plate girders, which are in turn freely supported by the concrete piers.

Supply problems in the aftermath of the War meant that the concrete piers were founded on jarrah timber piles, rather than concrete. Additionally, a steel plate shortage forced the bridge's designers to avoid the use of steel to design the forms in the bridge's superstructure. Also, the cement that was used on the bridges had to be procured from seven different sources, which led to variable durability of different parts of the bridges.

The previous Causeway had carried electric trams, and it was expected that the new Causeway would also do so, or perhaps trolleybuses instead. However, the proposed overhead wires were deemed too ugly for the new bridge, and between £30,000 and £40,000 could be saved by using buses instead. The tram routes using the Causeway were replaced with bus services but, despite that, the bridges were designed to be able to carry trams.

The south-eastern bridge was the first to be completed, and was opened on 19 September 1952, with traffic continuing to use the other two bridges of the previous Causeway. Work then continued on the north-western bridge with further reclamation of land.

Roundabouts were constructed at each end of The Causeway, to improve the flow of traffic on the bridges and the distribution of traffic back into the road network. The eastern roundabout opened in 1952, while the western one did not open until December 1954. Guides on the usage of the roundabouts were published in newspapers. In 1973, construction began on a grade-separated partial cloverleaf interchange at the eastern end of the Causeway. The $1.3 million interchange opened on 8 March 1974.

By 1954, traffic entering the city by the Causeway had doubled, leading to renewed calls for a new bridge further west at The Narrows. That bridge was eventually built as the Narrows Bridge, which opened in 1959. The Narrows and the Causeway continued to be the only road crossings of the Swan River between Fremantle and Maylands until the Windan Bridge of the Graham Farmer Freeway opened in 2000. The opening of the latter eastern bypass coincided with the conversion of the Causeway's two centre lanes to bus lanes. It also reduced traffic levels on the Causeway from  cars per day to  within six months. The western roundabout, the state's worst black spot since 1989, was also remodelled in 2000 into a traffic light-controlled raindrop roundabout, in conjunction with the other works on the Causeway.

The variable-quality of the cement which had been used in the construction of the Causeway bridges meant that, by the early 2000s, they had suffered significant damage. A repair contract was awarded to Kulin Group in 2004. Localised patching of cracks in the piers was undertaken. At the ends of the piers, the cracking was more substantial and had to be tied back with carbon fibre reinforcement. Repairs were then treated with a moisture-resistant coating, and were expected to lengthen the life of the bridges by decades.

The Causeway bridges received an interim entry on the Western Australian Register of Heritage Places on 30 June 1998, which was made permanent on 30 October 1998. They were also classified by the National Trust on 8 June 1998.

Route description 

The Causeway begins in East Perth, at the intersection of Riverside Drive, Adelaide Terrace, and Hay Street. This intersection is a traffic light controlled raindrop roundabout. The road continues straight across the island for another . The road passes over the second,   bridge, which links Heirisson Island to Victoria Park. The interchange links The Causeway with four other roads: Canning Highway to the south-west, Great Eastern Highway to the north-east, and both Shepperton Road and Albany Highway to the south-east. There is no access to Albany Highway from The Causeway, as Albany Highway is a one-way road leading into the interchange.

Intersections 

Northwestern end, East Perth:
  Riverside Drive south-west (State Route 5) – to Fremantle, Mitchell and Kwinana Freeways
 Adelaide Terrace north-west – to Perth City Centre, St Georges Terrace
 Hay Street north-east – to Perth City Centre, WACA Ground

Southeastern end, Victoria Park and Burswood:
  Great Eastern Highway north-east (National Highway 94 / Nation Route 1) – to Midland, Perth Airport
  Canning Highway south-west (National Route 1 / State Route 6) – to Fremantle
  Shepperton Road south-east (State Route 30) – to Armadale, Albany Highway
 Albany Highway south-east – no access

Engineering heritage award 
The current bridges received an Engineering Heritage Marker from Engineers Australia as part of its Engineering Heritage Recognition Program.

See also
 Narrows Bridge (Perth)
 Perth Water

Notes

References 
 ("Cygnet").

External links 

 Western Australian Register of Heritage Places entry for The Causeway
 Archival photographs of the Causeway over the years held by the State Library of Western Australia

Causeways
Road bridges in Perth, Western Australia
State Register of Heritage Places in the City of Perth
East Perth, Western Australia
Perth Water
Articles containing video clips
Former toll bridges in Australia
Recipients of Engineers Australia engineering heritage markers